Bukit Chagar RTS station is a elevated terminal station currently being built in Johor Bahru, Johor, Malaysia. It is scheduled to open by end 2026. When opened, an estimate of 60,000 additional commuters will be able to cross the Causeway during peak hours.

History
The Bukit Chagar station was announced on 15 September 2015 during the Iskandar Malaysia Comprehensive Development Plan Open Day in a public poll. The other three options were Tanjung Puteri, JB Sentral 1 and JB Sentral 2.

The Bukit Chagar RTS terminal station will be developed adjacent to proposed to be built Bukit Chagar Customs, Immigration and Quarantine (CIQ) complex and will not be sharing with existing facilities at the Sultan Iskandar Building CIQ complex. The terminal station has been proposed to alleviate the immigration checkpoint movement at Sultan Iskandar Building CIQ complex.

Construction of the Bukit Chagar RTS station started on 22 November 2020 in an online groundbreaking ceremony owing to the current COVID-19 pandemic. In the ceremony, the four-storey station will be co-located within a transit-oriented development with a transport hub and property developments around the station. 

On 19 February 2021, the design of the station was unveiled after a design competition. The station will be co-located within a four-storey Customs, Immigration and Quarantine (CIQ) facility, with the exterior having an intertwined roof symbolising shared ties between the people of Malaysia and Singapore as well as the long history. In addition, the station will have natural lighting to save energy, as well as self cleaning windows to reduce costs. The design shall be built with light-weight composite materials. It is hoped that immigration clearance is done seamlessly in the same building, with commuters having to go different floors before boarding the train.

References

Railway stations under construction in Malaysia
Buildings and structures in Johor Bahru
Transport in Johor Bahru